Miguel Peraza is a Mexican self-taught sculptor, born in Mexico City September 29, 1959. His production consists of about 300 works of small format and 34 monumental works, with many monuments along Mexico and Colombia, mainly in universities.
Throughout his career he has demonstrated mastery of materials, regardless of the size of his sculptures, and covering many topics.

Life and work
Peraza's first sculpture was made back in 1975. Since then, he has carved in different sizes and materials, such as bronze, marble, wood, stainless steel, and others.

He has participated in 28 individual and 2 group exhibitions, displaying his sculptural proposal  in several countries such as Colombia, Chile, Costa Rica, United States, France, Belgium, Netherlands, and Mexico.

Throughout his life he has gathered his artistic expression, teachings and publishing.

He has lectured more than 5 conferences in the United States, Colombia, Costa Rica, Chile, and Mexico.

He is a specialist in the following subjects: The Art of Art Marketing, Problems of Space, Theory of Color, as well as the Treatment and History of Sculpture.

His career has developed intimately with universities.
One of his main concerns is to show the importance of art in higher education by proposing to include it as part of the occupational skills and technique

Publications

He is co-author of "The Art of Art Marketing" (Editorial Plus, 1990).

External links 
 WEB page for Miguel Peraza http://www.miguelperaza.com/
 Evansville Vanderburgh Public Library https://web.archive.org/web/20110722092519/http://www.evpl.org/aboutus/exhibits/view.aspx?id=38
 Courier Evansville press http://www.courierpress.com/news/2010/mar/18/big-read-to-travel-beyond-the-literature/
 Tec. de Monterrey https://web.archive.org/web/20120305215425/http://www.itesm.edu/wps/portal?WCM_GLOBAL_CONTEXT=%2Fmigration%2FCCM2%2FCiudad+de+M_xico%2FAcerca+del+campus%2FHistoria%2F1990-2000
 Universidad Simón Bolivar https://web.archive.org/web/20110722224705/http://www.usb.edu.mx/downloads/publicaciones/Gacetas_usb/Gaceta_usb6/gacetausb-diciembre06-06.pdf
 Monumentos de Bucaramanga http://monumentosenbucaramanga.blogspot.com/

1959 births
Living people
Mexican sculptors
Male sculptors
People from Mexico City